Elections to High Peak Borough Council in Derbyshire, England were held on 3 May 2007. All of the council was up for election and the control of the council changed from no overall control to Conservative control. Overall turnout was 38.2%.

After the election, the composition of the council was:
Conservative 24
Labour 9
Liberal Democrat 6
Independent 4

Election result

Ward results

References

Official High Peak Results page.   Accessed 6 July 2010

2007
2007 English local elections
2000s in Derbyshire